The NCAA Division I FBS passing leaders are career, single-season, and single-game passing leaders in yards, touchdowns, efficiency, completions, completion percentage, and interception percentage. These lists are dominated by more recent players for several reasons:
 Since 1955, seasons have increased from 10 games to 11 and then 12 games in length.
 The NCAA didn't allow freshmen to play varsity football until 1972 (with the exception of the World War II years), allowing players to have four-year careers.
 Bowl games only began counting toward single-season and career statistics in 2002. This affects many players from before that time period. For example, Ty Detmer would have 16,206 yards and 127 touchdowns if bowl games were included in his career statistics, moving him up one rank on both.
 In recent decades, starting with the Southeastern Conference in 1992, FBS conferences have introduced their own championship games, which have always counted fully toward single-season and career statistics.
 The NCAA ruled that the 2020 season, heavily disrupted by COVID-19, would not count against the athletic eligibility of any football player. This gave every player active in that season the opportunity for five years of eligibility instead of the normal four.

Only seasons in which a team was considered to be a part of the Football Bowl Subdivision are included in these lists. Players such as Taylor Heinicke and Chad Pennington played for teams who reclassified to the FBS during their careers, and only their stats from the FBS years are eligible for inclusion. Similarly, players such as Vernon Adams and Bailey Zappe finished their careers by transferring to an FBS school, but their earlier seasons are not counted.

All records are current as of the end of the 2022 season.

Passing yards
The career leader in passing yards is Houston's Case Keenum. Keenum was granted a fifth year of eligibility after being injured in Houston's third game in 2010, but he would still top the list by over 1,500 yards if 2010 were not included. Keenum passed Hawaii's Timmy Chang, who also received a fifth year of eligibility after being injured in Hawaii's third game in 2001. Chang broke the record previously held by BYU's Ty Detmer, who shattered a record previously held by San Diego State's Todd Santos, who finished his career in 1987 and is no longer in the top 50.

The single-season leader in passing yards is Bailey Zappe, who transferred to Western Kentucky for his final year of eligibility after starting his career at FCS Houston Baptist (now Houston Christian). He broke a record that had stood for 18 years from Texas Tech's B. J. Symons. Prior to Symons, the record had been held by Detmer, who edged out Houston's David Klingler in 1990.

The first player to pass for 600 yards in a single game was Illinois' Dave Wilson, whose record stood for eight years. The 700-yard barrier was first breached in 1990 by David Klingler. The current single-game record of 734 is shared by Connor Halliday and Patrick Mahomes.

Passing touchdowns
The holders of the career and single-season passing yards records, Case Keenum and Bailey Zappe also hold the records for passing touchdowns. The single-game record holder is Houston's David Klingler, who threw for 11 touchdowns in a 1990 game against Eastern Washington.

Efficiency
Passing efficiency is a measure of quarterback performance based on the following formula:

Only passing statistics are included in the formula. Any yards or touchdowns gained rushing or by any other method are not a factor in the formula, and neither are fumbles. Players tend to rank highly on the list when they have a high completion percentage, high yards per completion, and many touchdowns to few interceptions. The career leader (with a minimum of 350 completions) in effiency is Alabama's Tua Tagovailoa. All of the top 10 in single-season efficiency have come since 2016, with Grayson McCall of Coastal Carolina breaking the record in 2021.

The NCAA does not recognize a single-game leaderboard in passing efficiency, and detailed box scores do not exist for every year going back to the beginning of college football, but the single-game record holder is Cincinnati's Gunner Kiel, who was 15-for-15 for 319 yards and 5 touchdowns in a 2015 game against UCF.

Completions
Case Keenum also holds the career record for completions. The single season record is held by Texas Tech's Graham Harrell. In fact, 13 of the top 17 performances on the single-season list were by quarterbacks who played under head coach Mike Leach.

Completion percentage

Alabama's Mac Jones holds the NCAA record for completion percentage, with 413 completions on 556 attempts. This is over 1.5 percentage points higher than the second place on the list, Northwestern's Dan Persa. The highest completion percentage among quarterbacks with over 1,000 career attempts is Mississippi State's Will Rogers.

Jones also holds the single-season record, having broken the previous record set by Texas's Colt McCoy. At the end of the 20th century, the single season record was held by Daunte Culpepper, and while he is still 6th on the list, 28 of the top 30 spots are from 21st century players (compared to all 30 on the career list being 21st century players).

The NCAA doesn't recognize a full list for single games, but top performances include:
 Minimum 15 attempts – 100% three times: (18 of 18) – Zach Wilson of 2018 BYU, (17 of 17) – Garrett Shrader of 2022 Syracuse, (15 of 15) – Gunner Kiel of 2015 Cincinnati
 Minimum 20 attempts – 96.00% (24 of 25) – Greyson Lambert of 2015 Georgia
 Minimum 30 attempts – 93.94% (31 of 33) – Kyle Allen of 2017 Houston
 Minimum 40 attempts – 90.91% (40 of 44) – Seth Doege of 2017 Texas Tech
 Minimum 50 attempts – 88.24% (45 of 51) – Geno Smith of 2012 West Virginia
 Minimum 60 attempts – 80.33% (49 of 61) – Carson Strong of 2021 Nevada

Interception Percentage
With a minimum of 500 passing attempts, Northern Illinois's Drew Hare is the only quarterback in FBS history with fewer than 1% of his passes intercepted. Before Hare, the record had been held by Baylor's Bryce Petty and before that, Fresno State's Billy Volek. The lowest interception percentage among quarterbacks with over 1,000 career attempts is Oregon's Marcus Mariota.

On the single-season list, 28 of the top 30 are 21st century players, though the list is topped by Virginia's Matt Blundin, who is the only player ever to have 20 passing attempts per game without throwing a single interception.

The single-game record is 0%, which is accomplished hundreds of times every season. However the quarterback with the most single-game attempts without throwing an interception is Houston's David Piland, who attempted 77 passes in a 2012 game against Louisiana Tech without any interceptions.

References

Passing yardage leaders